Ua Pou Airport is an airport on Ua Pou in French Polynesia . The airport is 11 km northwest of the village of Hakahau. As of 2021 it received 3900 passengers a year.

The runway is short, narrow, and slopes uphill, making Ua Pou an Altiport. Aircraft can only land when arriving from the sea, and can only take off towards the sea, whatever the prevailing wind. The runway is 846m long, with a 30m drop.

Airlines and destinations

Statistics

References

External links

Airports in French Polynesia
Altiports